Alan Littlejohn (4 January 1928 – 12 November 1996) was a British jazz trumpeter, flugelhornist and bandleader born in London, England, most notable for his work with artists such as Ben Webster, Earl Hines, Bill Coleman, Sonny Dee, Laurie Chescoe, Alvin Roy, and Billy Butterfield.

References

1928 births
1996 deaths
20th-century British musicians
British jazz trumpeters
Male trumpeters
20th-century trumpeters
20th-century British male musicians
British male jazz musicians